László István Orbán (born April 17, 1930, in Cluj, died May 31, 2018, in Balatonfűzfő) is one of the most significant fencers of the 1950s, 1960s and 1970s in Cluj who performed in national championships. Orbán raised the quality of the sport after the second world war and met challenges from much better supported and advantaged fencers from Bucharest. His grandfather was János Spáda, a famous architect in Kolozsvár (today Cluj-Napoca, Romania), and his cousin, Prof. Béla Orbán, a mathematician in the same city, all of them ethnic Hungarians.

Notes

References
 Sallai, AL (2009). Elfelejtett történetek: Folyamatosan a siker kapujában. Szabadság. Online Access (in Hungarian)
 Csomafáy Ferenc (2011). Megalakult a kolozsvári vívók baráti társasága, erdon.ro Online Access  (in Hungarian)
 Killyéni, A. (2018). Búcsú Orbán Laci bácsitól. Szabadság. Online Access (in Hungarian)

Sportspeople from Cluj-Napoca
Romanian sportspeople of Hungarian descent
Romanian male fencers
1930 births
2018 deaths